Andrea Milani may refer to:

 Andrea Milani (footballer, born 1919), Italian footballer with Inter Milan and Palermo
 Andrea Milani (footballer, born 1980), Italian footballer with Ancona
 Andrea Milani (mathematician), Italian mathematician